Sammi Cheng Sau-man (born 19 August 1972) is a Hong Kong singer and actress. She is considered one of the most prominent female singers in Hong Kong, with album sales of over million copies throughout Asia. Most notably in the 1990s, she was dubbed by the media as the "Cantopop Queen". Having success in entertainment industry for over three decades, Cheng is also best known for her roles in Hong Kong rom-com films in the early 2000s that were box office hits. 

Cheng holds the record of having the most best sales albums and The Best Sales Local Female Vocalist awards in the Hong Kong Cantopop industry since her debut. From 1993 to 2010, Cheng won a total of 12 Top Female Vocalist awards, 14 The Best Sales Local Female Vocalist Awards and has 7 albums that are The Best Sales Cantonese Release of year. She had also previously won the Most Popular Hong Kong Female Artist Award in annual Top Ten Jade Solid Gold Awards Presentation for three times, and in a year winning also the Gold Song Gold Award, the highest-ranked award which is the last to be presented at the ceremony. She also received Honorary Lifetime Achievement Award for Female Singer in 2011 Metro Radio Hits Awards. She had also won many top honors in various Chinese music awards held in Asia.

She has produced over 80 studio albums, 10 live concert albums, over 130 singles (songs) with also over 30 cover songs and had received numerous awards from acting to singing. She also starred in close to 40 films and 7 television dramas(in early years) and had held approximately 200 concerts up to date with over 12 concert tours. She is one of the female artists with most concert shows in Hong Kong Coliseum, at 102.

Early life
Sammi Cheng was previously named Twinnie Cheng. Contrary to popular belief, "Twiny" is not her birth name. The name came about when Sammi was still in school and her English Language teacher wanted everyone in class to have an English name. When Sammi turned to her sister for help, her sister came up with the name "Twiny". The name was later changed to "Sammi" as "Sammi" sounds a little like "Sau Man". Cheng received her education at SKH St. Peter's Primary School and Tang Shiu Kin Victoria Government Secondary School.

She has three sisters and one brother. Two of her sisters are twins.

Career

Music
Sammi Cheng entered the entertainment industry at the age of 16 through the New Talent Singing Awards in 1988. Although she came in third in the competition, the sponsoring record company Capital Artists saw her potential and offered her a recording contract. Cheng at the time was still in school, and had to balance her studies with her rising singing career. Sammi released 3 full-length studio albums prior to leaving school: "Sammi", "Holiday" and "Never Too Late". One of her first major award was the 1990 RTHK Top 10 Gold Songs Awards, where she was recognized as a best new prospect.

She capitalized on the attention received from her duet with artist Andy Hui, "Do you really have me in your heart?" (其實你心裡有沒有我), winning the 1993 Jade Solid Gold Top 10 Awards with that song. Cheng then went through a transformation, dying her hair orange, changing her style. Her 4th studio album "Sammi's Happy Maze" (鄭秀文的快樂迷宮) was also released, which include the hit single "Chotto Matte" (Chotto 等等), meaning 'wait a moment' in Japanese. Her new image fitted well with the new single, which was a remake of a Japanese song by Maki Ohguro. The success helped Sammi and boosted her singing career. In 1994 she continued to capitalize on her wild, new image. Her first album of that year was "Big Revenge" (大報復). The album included the hit "Ding Dong" (叮噹), which became one of Sammi's signature songs. But with her new fame also came a lot of backlash from the media. Critics argued that Sammi purposely westernized her Cantonese. Instead of saying "Ding Dong", Sammi pronounced it as "Deen Dong". Despite the criticism, the song was one of the most popular dance songs of that year. In 1994 the racy and controversial cut of "Ten Commandments" (十誡) was banned from the radio for a few days after its initial airplay of the track including tiny bits of what can be recognized as pornography soundtrack. In 1995 Cheng disappeared from the public eye for nearly half a year. Later that year, it was revealed that Warner Music Group had signed her. She let her hair color return to black and temporarily abandoned the wild image she used to have.

In 1995 she released her first album "Missing you" (捨不得你). In 1996, the company decided it was time for Sammi to expand her market and fan base beyond Hong Kong. They released her first Mandarin album, "Worth It" (值得). The album was number one on the Taiwan IFPI chart for six consecutive weeks. She won a number of awards, most notably she was voted back-to-back as the most popular female artist by TVB from 1996 to 1997. She went on to win the top female award again in 2001. She would finish that year with her first concert titled "Sammi's X-Dimension Concert" (鄭秀文X空間演唱會). In 1998 she was also a featured star in a Heineken sponsored Music Horizons concert along with international singers such as Boyz II Men and Julian Lennon. By the time Cheng was 24 years old, she had already released four greatest hits albums.

In the 1990s, another female star, Faye Wong was one of her main rivals. When they were on stage together, they would be cold to one another. The rivalry was confirmed in the 1999 TVB music award night. Both Wong and Cheng were arranged to sit next to each other backstage. Cheng avoided Wong by repeatedly going off stage to fix her make-up. In addition, her fans were angry and hissed at Faye Wong when she went on stage to receive an award. Wong herself has insisted that the rivalry wasn't true, and that she was friendly toward Cheng.

In July 2004, she held 7 nights of "Sammi Vs Sammi" concerts in Hong Kong. She also broke the record as being the youngest female singer to hold more than 50 accumulated concert nights in the city.

From December 2014 to January 2015, she held 12 nights of 'Touch Mi' concerts in Hong Kong Coliseum. She also invited heavyweight stars to be the guests of her concerts, including Andy Lau, Jacky Cheung, Leon Lai, Ekin Cheng, Louis Koo, Nick Cheung and Eason Chan. Her 'Touch Mi' concert extends to World Tour in 2015 and 2016 with 4 shows at Genting (Malaysia), 3 shows at Macau (China), 3 shows at Singapore, 2 shows at Guangzhou (China), 1 show at Foshan (China), 1 show at Melbourne (Australia), 2 shows at Sydney (Australia), 1 show at Shenzhen (China), 1 show at London (United Kingdom). Her 'Touch Mi' World Tour concluded in Hong Kong with another 8 shows in September 2016, hence bringing her total number of shows for this world tour to 38. Some of her new guest stars in Touch Mi 2 Hong Kong shows are Dayo Wong, Dicky Cheung, Francis Ng and Alex To.

In 2017, she held a series of mini-concert tours entitled Naked. Sammi in Taiwan and China. Also, she held a private mini-concert in Macau, entitled Sammi Cheng VIP Music Private Enjoy Show. She held a single-show Sidetrack Birthday Gig concert at Macau on 19 August 2018 in conjunction of her 46th birthday as a treat to her fans. At the same year she collaborate for the first time with Taiwanese rock band 831, releasing her remake song "眉飛色舞Plus" (Eyebrow Dance Plus).

In conjunction with her 30th anniversary in the entertainment industry, her 10th concert world tour is organized, which began with 13 shows at Hong Kong's Coliseum in July 2019. This brought her total shows in Hong Kong's Coliseum exceeding 100-mark, at 102.

In conjunction with her 49th birthday in 2021, she held a single-show 'Listen to Mi Birthday Gig' concert at Hong Kong on 18 August 2021. For her 50th birthday, she held a Christmas-themed 'You Are Beautiful To Mi Christmas Party' event at Hong Kong on December 2022.

Acting
Cheng's acting career began with the TVB series A Life of His Own (浪族闊少爺) in 1991. A year later she began her film career with the movie Best of the Best (飛虎精英之人間有情) in 1992 with fellow cantopop star Jacky Cheung. She would follow with another comedy film Feel 100% (百分百感覺) with Ekin Cheng and Gigi Leung.

In the late 1990s during the slump of the HK film industry she starred in the film Needing You... by director Johnnie To, co-starring Andy Lau and the movie Summer Holiday in 2000. The films were hits at the box office hit in all South East Asia regions, and Hong Kong has cumulated nearly HK$60 million at the box office. The Needing You... VCD received a sold out record of more than 200,000 copies. From this film, she was also a nominee for "Best Actress" as well as taking part in singing the "Best original film song" in the 2001 Hong Kong Film Award. Following the success of those movies she starred in a few more including Wu Yen, Love on a Diet, Marry a Rich Man, My Left Eye Sees Ghosts and many more. At the 62nd Venice International Film Festival Cheng was one of the front runner for the "Best actress" award for the film Everlasting Regret in 2005. Other contenders for the award included Monica Bellucci, Gwyneth Paltrow, Lee Young-ae and Isabelle Huppert.

Sammi had been nominated nine times in Hong Kong Film Awards for best actress, from her performance in 'Needing You' (2001), triple nominations in 2002 for 'Fighting for Love', 'Wu Yen' and 'Love on a Diet', in 2006 for 'Everlasting Regret', in 2012 for 'Romancing in Thin Air', in 2013 for 'Blind Detective' and double nominations in 2019 for 'Fagara' and 'Fatal Visit' but failed to win any so far. This made her to be the actress with most nominations as best actress in Hong Kong Film Awards' history but without any win. She had also received 3 past nominations (for films 'Needing You', 'My Left Eye Sees Ghost', and 'Blind Detective') in best actress at the Taiwan's Golden Horse Awards, the most prestigious awards on Chinese language film. She had won Best Actress from Hong Kong Film Critics Society Awards in 2002 for her titular role in 'Wu Yen'.

Due to her contribution in Hong Kong film industry and having starred in over 30 films, she is awarded 'Excellence in Asian Cinema' award in 11th Asian Film Awards on 2017.

For her role in 'Lost Love', she had won best actress from Hong Kong Film Critics Society Awards and Hong Kong Directors' Guild Awards in 2023 and is nominated at 41st Hong Kong Film Awards for best actress for the tenth time.

Advertisements
Cheng changes her look and image for every album, which enables her to gain extensive attention and appreciation from the music professional and the public. Sammi is a trendsetter of hair-coloring and has been chosen to be one of the Top Ten fashionable celebrities in Hong Kong. She has been signed and endorsed by many companies. These endorsements include SK-II skin care and Mona Lisa bridal service. Her first album with Warner Music Group, "Can't Give You Up" (捨不得你) released 3 hit singles, "Gentlemen, you are so fine today" (男仕今天你很好), "Can't Give You Up" (捨不得你) and "The Mourning Song for Love" (愛的輓歌). She was selected as the prominent celebrity for the endorsement of Panasonic using "Can't Give You Up" (捨不得你) as the theme song.

In the many years of her active presence in entertainment industry, she had been involved in multiple advertisements for various brands ranging from sports shoes, watches, clothings, massager, skin-care products, magazine covers, etc.

Post-break career

Break (2005–2007)
In 2005, Cheng had only one feature film release and no music projects. She became a representative for Veeko and Titus, a fashion and watch brand in Hong Kong, respectively. She also began writing Saturday columns for Mingpao magazine. In 2006, she released another greatest hits album, but there were no new tracks. The break was taken to recoup her energy from the entertainment industry.

During a break lasting more than a 1,000 days, she reflected upon her life, and became a born-again Christian.

Show Mi Tour
After taking a break for about 2 years, she re-invented herself again, and held her 6th concert in HK from 18 to 25 May 2007 titled "Show Mi" (Mi being the nickname of SamMI given by her fans). Due to the huge demand for tickets, the four performances was expanded to eight. She returned to entertain at the age of 34, and invited fellow star Andy Lau and Denise Ho to perform with her. At the end of the first show, audience members continued to shout 'encore' for 15 minutes until Sammi came back out and sang "Our Theme Song" (我們的主題曲). The concert was expanded to the Show Mi Tour.

She then continues actively in Hong Kong entertainment industry after about two years of rest, marking a strong comeback with many more concerts held at Hong Kong, Macau, mainland China, Taiwan, Singapore, Malaysia, Canada, United States, Australia, etc. She also continued to work in films and had starred in various commercial advertisements.

Community work
In 2003 Cheng performed at the 1:99 Concert to raise funds for SARS affected families. She had participated in the 2008 Chinese winter storm support effort where many artists including Andy Lau, Alan Tam, Kelly Chen, etc. recorded a song called "Warmth in the Snow" in support of those effected by the storm. She was also a participant of the Artistes 512 Fund Raising Campaign. In April 2008, she participated in the activities of World Vision. She traveled to Laos with fellow singer Gigi Leung, also a World Vision volunteer, to experience for themselves the struggles of the local people and children. They also visited the local children there to find out more on their situation where food and supplies are lacking. When Sammi returned to Hong Kong, she and Leung were invited to a radio program 903 to talk about the experience; she responded by announcing she had "adopted" 24 children.

Filmography

Film

Television series

Discography 

Cantonese studio albums
 Sammi (1990)
 Holiday (1991)
 Never Too Late (1992)
 Happy Maze (1993)
 Ten Commandments (1994)
 Lost Memory (1994)
 After (1995)
 Can't Let You Go (1995)
 Missing You (1996)
 Passion (1996)
 Our Theme Song (1997)
 Living Language (1997)
 Feel So Good (1998)
 Listen to Sammi (1999)
 Love You So Much (1999)
 Ladies First (2000)
 Love Is ... (2000)
 Shocking Pink (2001)
 Tender (2001)
 Becoming Sammi (2002)
 Wonder Woman (2002)
 La La La (2004)
 Sammi vs. Sammi (2004)
 Faith (2009)
 Love is Love (2013)
 Fabulous (2016)
 Believe in Mi (2018)
 Listen To Mi (2021)

Mandarin studio albums
 Worth It (1996)
 Waiting for You (1997)
 I Deserve (1999)
 To Love (2000)
 Complete (2001)
 Letting Go (2002)
 Beautiful Misunderstanding (2003)
 Faith (2010)
 Nude (2017)

Concerts
X Live '96 (1996)
Star Show (1997–1998)
i Concert '99 (1999–2000)
Shocking Colours Live (2001–2002)
Sammi vs. Sammi (2004)
Show Mi World Tour (2007–2008)
Love Mi World Tour (2009–2011)
Touch Mi World Tour (2014–2016) 
FOLLOWMi World Tour (2019-)

Awards and nominations

References

External links

 Sammi's Weibo

1972 births
Living people
People from Chenghai
20th-century Hong Kong women singers
20th-century Hong Kong actresses
21st-century Hong Kong women singers
21st-century Hong Kong actresses
Cantopop singers
Hong Kong Mandopop singers
Hong Kong film actresses
Hong Kong television actresses
New Talent Singing Awards contestants
Hong Kong evangelicals
Hong Kong Christians
Hong Kong Protestants
Hong Kong idols
People with Ménière's Disease
Media Asia Music Artists